Eliseo Salazar Valenzuela (born 14 November 1954) is a Chilean former racing driver. , he is the only Chilean to have participated in a Formula One World Championship. He made his Formula One debut on 15 March 1981, and ultimately contested 37 races scoring a total of three championship points. After Formula One, Salazar has participated in numerous motorsport disciplines, including the Chilean national rally championship (Champion 1984 and 1985), Formula 3000, IndyCar (including the Indianapolis 500 race seven times), and the World Sportscar Championship.

Career

Formula One (1981–1983)
After racing in the British F1 Championship in 1980 with a Williams FW07, and winning in Silverstone, he moved to Formula One in 1981, with March. He switched midseason to Ensign, and finished 6th in the Dutch Grand Prix. In 1982 he drove for ATS, and finished 5th in the San Marino Grand Prix, a race where only 7 teams entered due to the FISA–FOCA war. His most noted career moment in Formula One came when he collided with the overtaking race leader Nelson Piquet in the 1982 German Grand Prix. After both drivers got out of their stricken cars, the angry Piquet started to punch and kick Salazar. Salazar did not respond to the assault due to the friendship with the Brazilian driver, who helped him in his first European experiences as a driver. Months later Piquet apologised to Salazar over the phone, after being told by a BMW mechanic that the engine in his car was about to expire anyway, and that Salazar avoided BMW the embarrassment of an engine failure at their home race. (BMW officials were in attendance). In 1983 he entered six races with RAM Racing, but the car was very slow and he only managed to qualify twice. He finished 14th in Jacarepaguá and retired in Long Beach with gearbox failure.

After the Chilean economic crisis in the early years of the 80's, Salazar had to leave F1, and competed with little success at the Formula 3000 championship and the South American Formula Three Championship in some races. He began to race rally in Chile, becoming the champion of the 1985 hill-climbing season in Chile in a Toyota Corolla XT.

Sport Prototype (1988–1990)
In late '80s, Salazar drove some races in the FIA World Sport Prototype Championship. His best result was 1st place at the C-1 class in the '88 Fuji 1000 km in Japan with a Spice SE88C Ford car of the BP Spice Engineering. Thanks to his contacts with Tom Walkinshaw, he joined the Jaguar Silk-Cut factory team, to dispute the 24 Hours of Le Mans. In the 1989 race, the Chilean, with Alain and Michel Ferté, achieved the 8th place with the Jaguar XJR-9; but his best result would be winning the 1990 event of the historic race in a Jaguar XJR-12, but after driving several hours in the No. 3 car, he was forced to leave his seat to the British driver Martin Brundle, who received the chequered flag, and Salazar was forced to move to the No. 4 car, which retired at 20 hours with mechanical problems (Brundle's original car, the No. 1, was pulled out at 14 hours for electrical problems). For that particular fact, he was named the 1990 Sportsman of the Year by the British magazine Autosport.

Career in USA (1994–2002)
After years with no competition, working as a co-host in the TV show "Video Loco" (America's Funniest Videos' Chilean version, broadcast in Canal 13), Salazar received an opportunity to join the Ferrari-Momo factory team for the 1994 IMSA Sport Prototype championship in the WSC (World Sport Car) series, with the Italian Gianpiero Moretti. He raced at the Exxon World Sports Car Championship in 1994 and 1995 with several races won and podiums with the Ferrari 333 SP. Those results were good enough to pull him to the Indy Car World Series.

He signed a contract with the Dick Simon Racing in 1995 to race in the CART Indy Car World Series, with a strong debut at the Indy 500. With a Lola-Cosworth, he started 33rd and finished 4th in the Cristal-Copec-Mobil 1 No.7.

When the IRL and CART split in 1996, Salazar chose to compete in the new series. He became a regular top driver at Indy 500 with four Top 10 results. His best result at Indianapolis was in 2000, when he started and finished on 3rd place, at the wheel of a G-Force-Oldsmobile Aurora for A. J. Foyt Enterprises.

In 1997, Salazar earned his first and only victory in IRL racing, at the Las Vegas Motor Speedway, racing for Team Scandia. That year, he also made his only start at a NASCAR sanctioned race, finishing 17th on the Watkins Glen International road course, in the Craftsman Truck Series.

2000 and 2001 were the best years in the IRL for Salazar, finishing 4th and 5th in those championships, with five top 5 results in 2000. In 2002, he suffered a serious accident testing at Indianapolis, and was forced miss several races. After much consideration Salazar decided to retire from Indy Car racing and focus on Sports Cars.

Salazar later joined the American Le Mans Series, where he raced in a Porsche 911 GT3 and a Ferrari 360.

Present and future (2004–)
Salazar then returned to Chile where, in 2004, he joined the official Hyundai rally team in the Rally Mobil, the national rally championship. His car was an N3-class Hyundai Coupe GK 2.0L.

In November 2005, Salazar competed in the inaugural race of the Grand Prix Masters, as a late replacement for Alan Jones. In 2006 he raced in both GPM races in Qatar and England.

In 2007, Salazar moved to the N4-class of the Rally Mobil, the Chilean Rally Championship, driving a Mitsubishi Lancer Evo IX, and was 5th in his first year at the N4-Class with a car of the ING Team.

His last international project is to race the Lisboa-Dakar rally, with the objective of being the first driver to have raced in the Monaco Grand Prix, the Le Mans 24 Hours, the 24 Hours of Daytona, the Indianapolis 500 and the Dakar Rally. In February he signed a pre-contract with Jean-Louis Schlesser to drive one of his buggies at the 2008 Dakar Rally, but he could not get a deal with a sponsor and that year's running of the Dakar Rally was cancelled anyway.

In 2008, Salazar raced in the Rally Mobil with his own team, formed by 3 Mitsubishi Lancer Evo IX in the N4-Class.

He made his debut in the Dakar Rally in 2009 with a McRae Prototype, finishing in 88th place. He will compete in the 2010 edition as part of the Team Dakar USA, in a third Hummer H3, in addition to the ones raced by owner Robby Gordon and Frenchman Eric Vigouroux.

In 2013, Salazar introduced autocross (aka "solo racing") to Chile, with the first event being held 6 April 2013 at Estadio Monumental in Santiago. In September 2013, he participated in the Sports Car Club of America Solo National Championships in Lincoln, Nebraska, driving a C Prepared Ford Mustang.

Personal life
On 15 May 2001, Salazar had a son, also named Eliseo. The younger Salazar attended his first Indy 500 at the age of 8 days old.

Motorsports career results

Complete British Formula One Championship results
(key) (Races in bold indicate pole position; races in italics indicate fastest lap)

Formula One World Championship
(key)

24 Hours of Le Mans results

International Formula 3000
(key) (Races in bold indicate pole position; races in italics indicate fastest lap.)

American open-wheel racing
(key)

PPG Indycar Series
(key) (Races in bold indicate pole position)

IndyCar Series
(key) (Races in bold indicate pole position)

Indianapolis 500 results

NASCAR
(key) (Bold – Pole position awarded by qualifying time. Italics – Pole position earned by points standings or practice time. * – Most laps led.)

Craftsman Truck Series

Complete Grand Prix Masters results
(key) Races in bold indicate pole position, races in italics indicate fastest lap.

Dakar Rally results

World Rally Championship

References

External links

Living people
1954 births
Sportspeople from Santiago
Chilean racing drivers
Chilean Formula One drivers
Indianapolis 500 drivers
24 Hours of Le Mans drivers
24 Hours of Daytona drivers
Champ Car drivers
IndyCar Series drivers
TC 2000 Championship drivers
International Formula 3000 drivers
NASCAR drivers
Grand Prix Masters drivers
Top Race V6 drivers
Dakar Rally drivers
World Rally Championship drivers
Chilean people of Basque descent
March Formula One drivers
Ensign Formula One drivers
ATS Wheels Formula One drivers
RAM Racing Formula One drivers
Rolex Sports Car Series drivers
World Sportscar Championship drivers
British Formula One Championship drivers
A. J. Foyt Enterprises drivers